Blastococcus jejuensis  is a bacterium from the genus of Blastococcus which has been isolated from sand from the Gwakji beach at the Jeju Island in Korea.

References

 

Bacteria described in 2006
Actinomycetia